The Starr sting pain scale was created by the entomologist Christopher Starr as a scale to compare the overall pain of hymenopteran stings on a four-point scale, an expansion of the "pain index" originally created by Justin Schmidt. 1 is the lowest pain rating; 4 is the highest.

Scale

See also 
 Dol scale to measure pain
 Irukandji syndrome, a jellyfish sting-induced condition
 Pain scale
 Schmidt sting pain index by Justin O. Schmidt
 Scoville scale to measure the hotness of a chili pepper

References 
 
 Tom Turpin On Six Legs "Insects Bite and Sting for Good Reasons "
 David B. Williams DesertUSA "Tarantula Hawks"

Notes

External links
 Christopher K Starr Homepage - Publications

Insect bites and stings
Pain scales